This is the production discography of Ocean's 7.

Production discography

1999
Jagged Edge – J.E. Heartbreak
01. "Heartbreak" (co-wrote by Bryan-Michael Cox)
02. "Did She Say" (co-wrote by Jermaine Dupri and Bryan-Michael Cox)
03. "He Can't Love U" (co-wrote by Bryan-Michael Cox)
04 "What You Tryin' to Do" (co-wrote by Bryan-Michael Cox)
05. "Girl Is Mine" (featuring Ja Rule & Jermaine Dupri) 
06. "Healing" (co-wrote by Bryan-Michael Cox)
07 "Let's Get Married" (co-wrote by Bryan-Michael Cox)
10. "Promise" (co-wrote by Jermaine Dupri and Bryan-Michael Cox)
11. "Keys to the Range" (featuring Jermaine Dupri)
(Produced by Jermaine Dupri and Bryan-Michael Cox)

Toni Braxton – The Heat

 04. Just Be a Man About It (co-wrote by Bryan-Michael Cox and Johnta Austin)

2001
Usher – 8701
05.  "U Got It Bad" (co-wrote by Usher Raymond IV, Jermaine Dupri, and Bryan-Michael Cox)
(Produced by Jermaine Dupri and Bryan-Michael Cox)
06.  "If I Want To" (co-wrote by Usher Raymond IV, Jermaine Dupri, and Bryan-Michael Cox)
(produced by Jermaine Dupri, Bryan-Michael Cox, and Babyface)
08.  "I Can't Let U Go" (Produced by Jermaine Dupri and Bryan-Michael Cox)
13.  "Good Ol' Ghetto" (Produced by Jermaine Dupri and Bryan-Michael Cox)
14.  "U-Turn" (Produced by Jermaine Dupri and Bryan-Michael Cox)

Bow Wow - Beware of Dog
02. "The Future" (featuring R.O.C.) (co-written by Bryan-Michael Cox and Jermaine Dupril)
(Produced by Jermaine Dupri)
04 Puppy Love (featuring Jagged Edge) (co-written by Bryan-Michael Cox and Jermaine Dupri)
(Produced by Jermaine Dupri)

2002
Mariah Carey – Charmbracelet
03.  "The One" (co-written by Jermaine Dupri and Bryan-Michael Cox)
09.  "You Had Your Chance" (co-written by Jermaine Dupri and Bryan-Michael Cox)
16.  "Miss You" (featuring Jadakiss) (co-written by Jermaine Dupri and Bryan-Michael Cox)
(Produced by Mariah Carey, Jermaine Dupri, and Bryan-Michael Cox)

Monica – All Eyez on Me03.  "U Should've Known Better" (Monica, Jermaine Dupri, and Harold Lilly)
04.  "Too Hood" – (featuring Jermaine Dupri) 
09.  "If U Were The Girl"
(Produced by Jermaine Dupri and Bryan-Michael Cox)

2004
Usher – Confessions(Produced by Jermaine Dupri and Bryan-Michael Cox)
05. "Confessions, Part II" 
06. "Burn" 
15. "Do it to Me" 
 "Confessions, Pt. 2 (Remix)" (ft. Kanye West, Twista, Shyne, and Jermaine Dupri)

2005
Mariah Carey – Emancipation of Mimi01.  "It's Like That" (Produced by Jermaine Dupri and co-wrote by Johnta Austin)
02.  "We Belong Together" (Produced by Jermaine Dupri and co-wrote by Johnta Austin)
03.  "Shake It Off" (Co-Produced and co-written by Jermaine Dupri, Bryan-Michael Cox and Johnta Austin)
07.  "Get Your Number" (Co-Produced and co-written by Jermaine Dupri and Johnta Austin)
15.  "Don't Forget About Us" (Co-Produced and co-written by Jermaine Dupri, Bryan-Michael Cox and Johnta Austin)
16.  "Makin' It Last All Night (What It Do?)" (Co-Produced and co-written by Jermaine Dupri, Bryan-Michael Cox and Johnta Austin)

2006
Monica – The Makings of Me 
01.  "Everytime Tha Beat Drop" (featuring Dem Franchize Boyz)
05.  "Hell No (Leave Home)" (featuring Twista)
04.  "Why Her"
09.  "Getaway"

Bow Wow – The Price of Fame
03. 4 Corners (ft Lil Wayne, Pimp C, Lil Scrappy & Short Dawg) (Produced by Jermaine Dupri)
04. "Outta My System" (ft T-Pain & Johnta Austin) (Produced by Jermaine Dupri and Bryan-Michael Cox)
05. How You Move It (Produced by Jermaine Dupri)
06. "Shortie Like Mine" (ft Chris Brown & Johnta Austin) (Produced and co-written by Jermaine Dupri, Bryan-Michael Cox and Johnta Austin)
07. Don't Know About That (ft Young Capone & Cocaine J) (Produced by Jermaine Dupri)
08. Tell Me (Produced by Jermaine Dupri)
09. Damn Thing (ft Da Brat) (Produced by Jermaine Dupri)
10. Bet That (Produced by Jermaine Dupri)

2008
Mariah Carey – E=MC²03.  "Cruise Control" (featuring Damian Marley) 
07.  "Love Story"
09. "Last Kiss" 
10.  "Thanx 4 Nothin'"

Usher – Here I Stand''
08.  "Something Special" (Produced by Jermaine Dupri with No I.D. and Manuel Seal)
10. "Best Thing" (ft. Jay-Z)
11.  "Before I Met You" (Co-wrote by Bryan Michael-Cox and Johnta Austin)
14.  "What's a Man to Do" (Co-wrote by Johnta Austin)
19.  "Chivalry (Bonus Track)" (ft. Jermaine Dupri)

2009
Trey Songz – Ready
04. "I Need a Girl" (co-wrote by Johnta Austin)
05. One Love (co-wrote by Bryan Michael-Cox and Johnta Austin)

2010
Monica – Still Standing
09.  "Love All Over Me" (Produced with Bryan-Michael Cox)

Mariah Carey – Merry Christmas II You
02.  "Oh Santa!" 
07.  "Here Comes Santa Claus" 
14.  "Oh Santa (Remix)" 
(Produced with Bryan-Michael Cox & Mariah Carey) 

Usher – Raymond v. Raymond
09.  "Foolin' Around" (co-wrote by Johnta Austin, Bryan-Michael Cox, Jermaine Dupri, and Usher Raymond IV)

2012
Monica – New Life
09.  "Amazing" (Produced with Bryan-Michael Cox)

2014
Mariah Carey – Me. I Am Mariah... The Elusive Chanteuse
06.  "Make It Look Good" 
(Produced by Jermaine Dupri and Bryan-Michael Cox)
08.  "You Don't Know What to Do" (feat. Wale) 
(Produced by Jermaine Dupri and Bryan-Michael Cox)
09.  "Supernatural" 
13.  "One More Try" 
14.  "Heavenly (No Ways Tired / Can't Give Up Now)" 
(Produced with Bryan-Michael Cox)

Jagged Edge – J.E. Heartbreak 2
03.  "Familiar" 
04.  "Hope" 
05.  "Things I Do For You" 
08.  "Wanna Be (Romeo)" 
09.  "Getting Over You" 
(Produced by Jermaine Dupri and Bryan-Michael Cox)

2016
Drake - Views 
09. - "Faithful" (co-wrote by Johnta Austin and Bryan-Michael Cox)

2019
Johntá Austin – Love, Sex, & Religion
03.  "Born Again" (Produced by Jermaine Dupri and Bryan-Michael Cox)
04.  "Love Culture" (Produced by Bryan-Michael Cox)
06.  "Ride" (Produced by Bryan-Michael Cox)
09.  "Making Love to God" (Produced by Jermaine Dupri and Bryan-Michael Cox)

Tory Lanez - Chixtape 5
13. "Still Waiting" - (co-wrote by Johnta Austin and Trey Songz)

2020
Usher – TBD

"Don't Waste My Time" featuring Ella Mai (co-written by Usher Raymond IV, Jermaine Dupri, and Bryan-Michael Cox)
(Produced by Jermaine Dupri and Bryan-Michael Cox)
SexBeat (Written by Jermaine Dupri)

Trey Songz – Back Home
18. "All This Love" (co-written by T. Neverson, N. Neverson, Troy Taylor, Eric Hudson, and Johnta Austin)
(Co-produced by Johnta Austin)

2021
Ari Lennox – "Pressure" (co-wrote by Jermaine Dupri, Bryan-Michael Cox, and Johnta Austin)

References 

Discographies of American artists
Hip hop discographies
Rhythm and blues discographies
Pop music group discographies
Production discographies